Morashi, also Marashi, is a given name  of Iranian origin meaning ‘happy-one’ possibly indicating ancestry from Ali al-Marash, the grandson of the fourth Shia imam, Ali ibn Husayn, also known as Zayn al-Abidin. The name is generally associated with a clan of Shi'ite Muslims who are descended from Ali ibn Husayn, who himself was a great-grandson of the Islamic prophet Muhammad.  Today, about 2,000,000 members of the Marashi clan are mostly found in Iran, Türkie, Iraq, Syria, Kashmir and the UAE.

See also
Marash
Marashi (disambiguation)
Sayyid
Zayn al-Abidin
Amol
Mir-i Buzurg
Qazi Nurullah Shustari
Mar'ashi Najafi library
Hossein Marashi
Effat Marashi
Ibrahim al-Marashi
Sayyid Salabat Khan Zulfiqar Jang
Surnames
Pakistani people of Arab descent